Colin Hollis (born 30 May 1938) is a retired Australian federal politician. He was an Australian Labor Party member of the Australian House of Representatives from 1983 to 2001.

Hollis was born in Wauchope, New South Wales, and received a BSc (Econ) (Hons) from the University of London, a BA from the Open University, a Diploma in International Affairs from the University of London, and a Diploma of Continuing Education from the University of New England.

From 1983 to 1984 Hollis represented the seat of Macarthur. Then he switched to the seat of  Throsby, which he represented from 1984 to his retirement in 2001.

References

Members of the Australian House of Representatives for Macarthur
Members of the Australian House of Representatives for Throsby
Australian Labor Party members of the Parliament of Australia
Alumni of the University of London
Alumni of the Open University
1938 births
Living people
21st-century Australian politicians
20th-century Australian politicians